The 2014 Quick Lane Bowl was a post-season college football bowl game between the Rutgers Scarlet Knights and the North Carolina Tar Heels played on December 26, 2014, at Ford Field in Detroit, Michigan. It was the first edition of the Quick Lane Bowl, replacing the Little Caesars Pizza Bowl, and the final game of the 2014 NCAA Division I FBS football season for both teams. For 2014 bowl season the Quick Lane Bowl had contractual tie-ins with the Big Ten Conference and the Atlantic Coast Conference. With the discontinuance of the Little Caesars Bowl, successor to the Motor City Bowl, it was the first time since 1997 that a Mid-American Conference team did not play a post-season game in Detroit.  The game was sponsored by Ford Motor Company through its service-center brand Quick Lane.

Team selection
This was the seventh overall meeting between these two teams, with the series tied 3–3 coming into the game. The previous time these two teams met was in 2011.

Rutgers Scarlet Knights

The Rutgers Scarlet Knights posted a 7–5 record (3–5 conference) in their first year competing in the Big Ten after moving over from the American Athletic Conference. As the regular season came to a close Rutgers officials entered into negotiations with several bowls, hoping to secure a post-season berth. Although apparently preferring the TaxSlayer and Music City Bowl, both of which had obligations to accept Big Ten teams, Rutgers accepted when Tom Lewand, president of the Detroit Lions and CEO of the Quick Lane bowl, extended an invitation on December 7, 2014. With the acceptance head coach Kyle Flood became the first in Rutgers history to reach a bowl game in his first three seasons.

North Carolina Tar Heels

The North Carolina Tar Heels finished the regular season 6–6 (4–4 conference) under third-year head coach Larry Fedora. This is the first time North Carolina will play a bowl game in the state of Michigan. Other possible destinations for UNC were the Independence Bowl, Military Bowl, and the St. Petersburg Bowl.

Game summary

Scoring summary

Source:

Statistics

References

External links
 Game summary at ESPN

Quick Lane Bowl
Quick Lane Bowl
North Carolina Tar Heels football bowl games
Rutgers Scarlet Knights football bowl games
Quick Lane Bowl
Quick Lane Bowl